Ikela is a market town in Tshuapa, Democratic Republic of Congo, lying on the Tshuapa River east of Boende.  Founded by Belgium in the early twentieth century as a trading post, it became an important local centre.
It is the headquarters of the Ikela Territory.

The town was largely destroyed in the Second Congo War, being for many years under siege from Congolese Rally for Democracy forces.  Its population of 15,000 almost all fled, but around half have since returned to reconstruct it.

Ikela is served by Ikela Airport.

External links
 Mines Advisory Group on the Zanga-Zanga group operations in Ikela

References

Populated places in Tshuapa